Ildefonso Joaquín Infante y Macías (Moguer, Huelva, 31 May 1813 - Moguer, Huelva, 2 July 1888) was a Spanish ecclesiastic, second Bishop of the Roman Catholic Diocese of San Cristóbal de La Laguna.

Episcopate 
On 18 June 1876 he was consecrated bishop in the diocese of Cadiz, a position he held in Ceuta until 20 May 1877 that happened to be of the Diocese of San Cristóbal de La Laguna or Tenerife. There he excelled in his position, establishing free schools for poor children, missions to evangelize the peoples, and moral and liturgical conferences to stimulate the clergy.

He retired from the position of bishop of Tenerife in January 1882.

He died on 2 July 1888 in Moguer, and was buried in the Hermitage of Our Lady of Montemayor.

Notes

External links 
 Personal file in Catholic hierarchy.

1813 births
1888 deaths
Roman Catholic bishops of San Cristóbal de La Laguna
19th-century Roman Catholic bishops in Spain